Utah State University (USU or Utah State)  is a public land-grant research university with its main campus in Logan, Utah. It is accredited by the Northwest Commission on Colleges and Universities. With nearly 20,000 students living on or near campus, USU is Utah's largest public residential campus. As of Fall 2022, there were 27,943 students enrolled, including 24,835 undergraduate students and 3,108 graduate students. The university has the highest percentage of out-of-state students of any public university in Utah, totaling 23% of the student body.

Founded in 1888 as Utah's land-grant college, USU focused on science, engineering, agriculture, domestic arts, military science, and mechanic arts. The university offers programs in liberal arts, engineering, business, economics, natural resource sciences, and nationally ranked elementary & secondary education programs. It offers master's and doctoral programs in humanities, social sciences, and STEM areas (science, technology, engineering, and mathematics). It received its current name in 1957.

The university is classified among "R1: Doctoral Universities – Very high research activity". Utah State University is associated with 7 Rhodes Scholars, 1 Nobel Prize winner, 1 MacArthur Fellows Program inductee, 4 recipients of the Harry S. Truman Scholarship, and 34 recipients of the Barry M. Goldwater Scholarship. USU has 9 colleges and offers 159 undergraduate degrees, 83 master's degrees, and 41 doctoral degrees. USU's main campus is in Logan, with statewide campuses in Brigham City, Tooele, and the Uintah Basin, and 28 other locations throughout Utah. In 2010, the College of Eastern Utah, in Price, Utah, joined the USU system becoming Utah State University College of Eastern Utah (USU Eastern). Throughout Utah, USU operates more than 20 distance education centers. Regional campuses, USU Eastern, and distance education centers account for 25% of the students enrolled. USU has 163,000 alumni in all 50 states and 114 countries.

USU's athletic teams compete in Division I of the NCAA and are collectively known as the Utah State Aggies. They are a member of the Mountain West Conference.

History

Background and founding 

On December 16, 1861, Justin Morrill (VT) introduced a bill into the U.S. House of Representatives "to establish at least one college in each state upon a sure and perpetual foundation, accessible to all, but especially to the sons of toil..." President Abraham Lincoln signed the Morrill Land-Grant Colleges Act into effect in July of the following year.

Meanwhile, after visiting a few rural agricultural schools in his native Denmark, Anthon H. Lund of the Utah Territorial Legislature decided that there existed in the Utah Territory a need for such a school fusing the highest in scientific and academic research with agriculture, the way of life for the vast majority of locals. Upon returning to the United States, Lund heard about the Morrill Act and pitched a vision for the college that would receive widespread support among members of the Territorial Legislature, who was seeking to reapply for statehood. Now there came the question of location. According to historian Joel Ricks in 1938, "Provo had received the Insane Asylum, Salt Lake City had the University and Capitol, and most of the legislature felt that the new institutions should be given to Weber and Cache Counties." Citizens in Logan, Cache County, banded together and successfully lobbied representatives for the honor. The bill to establish the Agricultural College of Utah was passed on March 8, 1888, and on September 2, 1890, 14-year-old Miss Vendla Berntson enrolled as its first student.

Consolidation controversies 

In its early years, the college narrowly dodged two major campaigns to consolidate its operations with the University of Utah. Much controversy arose in response to President William J. Kerr's expansion of the college's scope beyond its agricultural roots. Detractors in Salt Lake City feared that such an expansion would come at the University of Utah's expense and pushed consolidation as a counter.

In 1907, an agreement was struck to limit the Agricultural College's curricula strictly to agriculture, domestic science, and mechanic arts. This meant closing all departments in Logan, including the already-impressive music department, which did not fall under that umbrella. Consequently, the University of Utah became solely responsible, for a time, for courses in engineering, law, medicine, fine arts, and pedagogy, despite the Agricultural College's initial charter in 1888, which mandated that it offer instruction in such things. The bulk of the curricular restrictions was lifted during the next two decades, except law and medicine, which have since remained the sole property of the University of Utah.

Widespread growth 

The Agricultural College grew modestly amid the tumult, adding its statewide Extension program in 1914. A year later, the first master's degrees were granted. UAC, as the Utah Agricultural College was commonly abbreviated, also received a notable boost in students as a direct result of World War I. Colleges and universities nationwide were temporarily transformed into training grounds for the short-lived Student Army Training Corps, composed of students who received military instruction and could then return to their educations following their military service. As the then-tiny campus could not otherwise support such large numbers of new students, college president Elmer Peterson convinced the state in 1918 to appropriate funds for permanent brick buildings, which could be used as living space for SATC students during the war, and instruction afterward. Though the war was soon to end, the campus essentially doubled in size.

The 1920s and 1930s saw the genesis of major growth.  A School of Education was added in 1928, a prelude to the institution being renamed Utah State Agricultural College in 1929. Doctoral degrees were first granted in 1950. In 1957, the school was granted university status as Utah State University of Agriculture and Applied Science, but the short name Utah State University is used even in official documents.

At the beginning of World War II, Utah State was one of six colleges selected by the United States Navy to give a Primary School in the highly unusual Electronics Training Program (ETP). Starting March 23, 1942, and each month after, a new group of 100 Navy students arrived for three months of 14-hour days in concentrated electrical engineering study. Smart Gymnasium was converted to a dormitory, and Old Main was fitted out for classrooms and laboratories. Larry S. Cole was named Program Director, and Waldo G. Hobson was the Director of Instruction. ETP admission required passing the Eddy Test, one of the most selective qualifying exams given during the war years. At a given time, some 300 Navy students were on the campus, greatly augmenting the war-years regular enrollment of 1000. Sidney R. Stock had earlier developed the Radio and Aviation Department and entered the Navy as a Lieutenant Commander to assist in organizing electronics training. He was a member of the committee in Washington that planned the ETP and shortly returned to Utah State as the Officer-in-Charge. The ETP Primary School continued at Utah State until August 1944, graduating about 2,750 students in 30 classes.

During the late 1970s, controversy again erupted on campus surrounding the school's historically sizeable Iranian population. As U.S. relations with Iran began to deteriorate throughout the decade, Iranian students on campus began staging protests against the Shah, which demonstrations met with some backlash in the community. Following the outbreak of the hostage crisis of 1979, immigration officials arrived on campus to interview each Iranian, an event that alienated many international and domestic students. For a time, the population of Middle Eastern students declined sharply and has only recently begun to rise again.

Toward the end of the 20th century, Utah State began taking more strides to shed its reputation as a small regional college and transform itself into a nationally prominent university. Under the auspices of President George Emert, who served at USU's helm from 1992 to 2000, the university's endowment increased from $7 million to $80 million. Scholarships, contracts, and grants increased substantially as well.

21st century 

Especially under former president Stan Albrecht, USU forged collaborations with several foreign institutions and governments. The university is continuing to grow in terms of enrollment, endowment, and research. The Merrill-Cazier Library opened in 2005, and other facilities have followed. In 2010, USU acquired both the Swaner EcoCenter outside Park City as well as the former College of Eastern Utah, with its two campuses and various undergraduate and vocational programs. In 2012, the university successfully concluded a $400 million fundraising campaign, the largest ever at USU. As of 2019, the university's endowment was $402.9 million.

System 

As Utah's land grant university, the Utah State University system operates throughout the state of Utah. The earliest roots of USU's distance education go back to 1904 when USU professors traveled by train from Logan to Burley, Idaho to deliver dairy lectures. In the 1950s, professors regularly drove around the state to teach courses and advise students. The first Statewide Campus, Uintah Basin, was designated by the Utah State Legislature in 1967. The next year, "flying professors" traveled weekly to teach at USU's various campuses and centers. Traveling to-and-from the centers was necessary until satellite systems were installed in 1996. In 2005, University President Stan Albrecht established USU Regional Campuses and Distance Education. The system grew in 2010 with the addition of USU Eastern to nearly one half of USU's enrollment. Today, the USU system includes the College of Eastern Utah, 3 Regional Campuses, 21 Distance Education centers, and 30 Extension sites. In 2012, RCDE completed construction of the Regional Campuses Distance Education (RCDE) Building which houses broadcast classrooms, RCDE offices, and the Utah Education Network.

Utah State University Eastern 

Located in Price, Utah, the former College of Eastern Utah joined the USU system in 2010 and became Utah State University College of Eastern Utah (USU Eastern). In 2013, the official name was shortened to Utah State University Eastern. USU Eastern operates a satellite campus, known as the Blanding campus, in Blanding, Utah. Before the merger, USU taught courses at the college through Regional Campuses and Distance Education (RCDE). USU Eastern is a junior college and offers associate degrees, certificates, and vocational programs. Bachelor's, master's, and doctoral courses, however, are available on-site through RCDE. USU Eastern competes as the Eastern Utah Golden Eagles and is the only campus besides Logan with an athletics program.

Statewide Campuses

Regional Campuses and Distance Education (RCDE) work to fulfill USU's land-grant mission to increase access to high-quality education throughout Utah. Growth of RCDE is outpacing that of the Logan campus with enrollment up 4.5% to 12,650 students enrolled in RCDE courses in 2011.

Regional campuses exist in Brigham City, Tooele, and the Uintah Basin (Vernal and Roosevelt). RCDE offers courses at Price and San Juan campuses that constituted the former College of Eastern Utah (now known as Utah State University Eastern). Distance Education operates 21 education centers throughout the state, including Moab, Kaysville, Ephraim, Orem, and Salt Lake City. At each of these locations, students may receive a wide selection of degrees without ever stepping foot on the Logan campus. Courses and degrees are also made available online through Distance Education.

USU has a growing presence in Moab, with 295 students in 2011. The City of Moab committed up to $75,000 per year over the decade beginning in 2012 to promote the development of the campus. Degrees specific to the community's needs, including social work and recreation resource management, are planned for the new campus.

Cooperative Extension 
Started in 1914, Utah State University Cooperative Extension, referred to simply as Extension, provides research-based, unbiased information to communities through their county offices and is an integral part of a land-grant institution. Extension operates 30 offices throughout the state, which include Swaner EcoCenter, Thanksgiving Point, and the Utah Botanical Center. With a focus on teaching, research, and public service, Extension programs include 4-H, agribusiness, Expanded Food and Nutrition Education, gardening and yard care, personal finance, and animal health.

Logan campus 

The campus lies on a "bench," or shelf-like foothill overlooking the valley to the west. Mount Logan and the Bear River Range rise sharply to the immediate east. The campus contains more than 100 major buildings. Most student activity is centered around the south end of campus, which is home to the vast majority of academic departments, the Quad, the Taggart Student Center, and the Old Main building.

Notable structures include Old Main, the college's first building, as well as the Merrill-Cazier Library, the  main university library, which houses more than 1,800,000 total volumes. The library also boasts an extensive special collections and archives area, an automated storage and retrieval system, and more than 150 workstations and 33 group study rooms. Also notable is the Manon Caine Russell-Kathryn Caine Wanlass Performance Hall, said to contain some of the best acoustics in the entire Western United States.

The Logan City Cemetery splits much of the campus in half. To the south lie most academic buildings, and the west and north are situated the Dee Glen Smith Spectrum and Merlin Olsen Field at Maverik Stadium, respectively. Many scientific and agricultural research buildings are located even farther north. Nearby Logan Canyon is a popular recreation destination for students, with a system of trails and parks running along the river. In addition to camping and hiking, the canyon also serves as the primary route to nearby Beaver Mountain Ski Resort and Bear Lake. The university's Outdoor Recreation Program rents camping, water sports, mountain sports, and winter sports equipment to students, as well as providing them with area trail maps and expertise for their ventures into the canyon and elsewhere.

Student life 

Utah State is the largest public residential campus in Utah, and nearly 18,000 students live on or directly adjacent to the campus. The university is the center of activity for the entire area, and the campus community is considered very close-knit. Twenty-one widely varying on-campus buildings house single students, and 39 buildings on the north side of campus are available for married housing. Many more students live in the multitude of off-campus housing options nearby. Students on campus may dine in one of two cafeterias and the Quadside Cafe at Merrill-Cazier Library, which offers paninis, soups, beverages, and more.  There is also a full-service Skyroom restaurant and the Hub, which includes several dining options. On the east edge of campus sits Aggie Ice Cream, a local tourist hotspot dating back to 1888, which produces "world-famous" ice cream and cheese products, as well as sandwiches and soups.

Starting in Old Main, USU has had a creamery since its founding in 1888. Students studying dairying and domestic arts applied to learn how to make both ice cream and cheeses. In 1921, Gustav Wilster began working with the College of Agriculture. By 1922, students studied dairy technology, fluid milk processing, ice cream manufacture, dairy engineering, cheese manufacture, butter making, dairy facility inspection, and dairy product judging. Wilster's students would go on to create Casper's Ice Cream, Farr's Ice Cream, and Snelgrove's Ice Cream. In 1975, the Nutrition and Food Sciences building was built, which is where Aggie Ice Cream is housed today. Aggie Ice Cream receives its milk from the Caine Dairy Research and Teaching Center located near the Wellsville Mountains.

Along with Aggie Ice Cream, well-known traditions include the rite of passage of becoming a True Aggie, which requires a student to kiss someone who is already a True Aggie on top of the Block "A." Two students may also become True Aggies together on Homecoming night or A-Day. At one point recently, USU held the title in the Guinness Book of World Records for the most couples kissing at the same place at the same time. Nearby the Block "A" is the lighted "A" atop the Old Main tower, which shines white throughout the entire valley, and blue on nights when a varsity sport has picked up a victory, or other special events have occurred on campus.

Every student at Utah State is represented by the USUSA (Utah State University Student Association), which is composed of 17 elected student officers and 5 appointed student officers. These officers typically oversee a certain area of responsibility that is outlined in each officer's charter. The responsibilities of USUSA officers can range from overseeing campus events and activities to promoting and advocating for particular initiatives at the Utah State Legislature. In February of each school year, campaigns are launched by students who wish to serve in the following year's USUSA. Campaigns last one week and consist of a primary and general election in which the top two vote-getters from the primary advance to the general election, and the candidate who receives a majority vote in the general election is announced as the winner.

The USUSA received significant attention during the 2016–2017 school year when the organization declared a mental health crisis at Utah State University. The legislation (written by USUSA Student Body President Ashley Waddoups, USUSA Student Advocate Vice President Matthew Clewett, and USUSA Graduate Studies Senator Ty Aller) sought to raise awareness of significant wait times for students to utilize CAPS (Counseling and Psychological Services) at Utah State as well as the increasing number of students who were suffering from mental health-related illnesses. After a successful lobbying campaign, the USUSA was able to influence the Utah State Legislature to pass a resolution declaring a mental health crisis at all USHE (Utah System of Higher Education) institutions. The resolution was subsequently signed by Utah Governor Gary Herbert in March 2017.

Students have full access to the HPER (pronounced "hyper"), Nelson Fieldhouse, and the ARC (Aggie Recreation Center) exercise facilities, which include basketball courts, indoor rock climbing, gymnastics equipment, two swimming pools, racquetball, squash, and outdoor field space for lacrosse, rugby, soccer, ultimate, and other sports. USU students are also involved in more than 100 clubs, an active and influential student government, seven fraternities and three sororities, multiple intramural and club sports, and a student-run radio station.

In 1970, Utah State student Sue Brown and Director of Student Activities Val R. Christensen created one of the first service organizations in the nation. VOICE, Volunteer Organization for Involvement in the Community and Environment, worked to improve the environment and social issues in Cache Valley. VOICE became The Val R. Christensen Service Center in 1999 in honor of Dr. Christensen's efforts and support of the organization. Today, students are involved in more than 20 service organizations including Aggie Special Olympics, Aggies for Africa, Alternative Breaks, and Senior University.

Colleges 

Founded in 1888, Utah State University is the agricultural college and land grant institution for Utah. In 1903, USU was divided into five schools: the School of Agriculture, the School of Agricultural Engineering and Mechanical Arts, the School of Home Economics, the School of General Science, and the School of Commerce. In 1907, the State of Utah prohibited USU from providing degrees in teaching and engineering (to prevent competition with the University of Utah). In 1923, the university expanded to six academic colleges: Agriculture, Home Economics, Agricultural Engineering, Commerce and Business Administration, Mechanic Arts, and General Science. In 1924, the institution added a School of Education, and restructured the School of General Science to include a School of Basic Arts and Sciences.

Today, USU is organized into nine academic colleges:

Caine College of the Arts 

Formerly existing as a non-degree-granting institution within the College of Humanities, Arts & Social Sciences, the Caine College became a free-standing college on July 1, 2010. The Caine College of the Arts houses the departments of Art & Design, Music, and Theatre Arts, along with the Nora Eccles Harrison Museum of Art. Performance facilities include the Chase Fine Arts Center, which houses the Kent Concert Hall among other venues, and the free-standing Manon Caine Russell-Kathryn Caine Wanlass Performance Hall, completed in 2006.  The 400-seat Performance Hall, designed by the architectural firm Sasaki Associates, has been praised as one of the best acoustic performance spaces in the American West, and received an Honor Award from the Utah Chapter of the American Institute of Architects. The Nora Eccles Harrison Museum of Art, designed by architect Edward Larrabee Barnes and opened in 1982, contains one of the largest art collections in the Intermountain Region.  Its holdings include nationally significant collections of ceramics, Native American art, and especially artworks produced in the American West since 1945.

USU's music program includes opera singer Michael Ballam and the Fry Street Quartet, USU's string quartet-in-residence.

College of Agriculture and Applied Sciences 
The College of Agriculture and Applied Sciences was the first academic college at USU and is known for ground-breaking animal genetics and human nutrition and food science research, as well as other significant breakthroughs and global outreach in plants and soil science, animal science, veterinary science and economics and applied agriculture. College researchers were instrumental in the creation of the first cloned equines (horses), in a project collaboration with researchers at the University of Idaho. The college is also a leader in the international project to classify and research the sheep genome. The College of Agriculture includes six departments: Applied Sciences, Technology & Education (Aviation Technology); Animal, Dairy & Veterinary Sciences; Applied Economics; Landscape Architecture and Environmental Planning; Nutrition, Dietetics & Food Sciences; and Plants, Soils & Climate.

The college is also home to Utah's first Doctor of Veterinary Medicine (DVM) program. The program is a regional program in collaboration with Washington State University in Pullman, Washington. Each year, the program accepts 20 Utah residents and ten non-Utah residents. Students spend their first two years receiving pre-clinical training at USU's Logan campus. They spend the final two years at WSU's College of Veterinary Medicine in Pullman, Washington completing the clinical portion of their veterinary education.

The college is also known for producing its nationally known, award-winning Aggie Ice Cream and cheeses through its Nutrition and Food Science Department.

In 2013 the name of the college was changed from the College of Agriculture to the College of Agriculture and Applied Sciences to reflect the broad nature of the college.

College of Engineering 

Much of USU's most widespread academic renown stems directly from the College of Engineering. USU houses the Space Dynamics Laboratory (SDL) which is a University Affiliated Research Center (UARC) focusing on military and science applications. SDL frequently submits projects to the Department of Defense and NASA. According to recent National Science Foundation statistics, USU ranked first among all universities in the U.S. in funding for aerospace research.  USU has also won multiple national aerospace engineering competitions in the past, including two in the 2008–09 academic year alone.

The Utah Water Research Laboratory is the oldest and largest facility of its kind in the nation. USU is considered the world's No. 1 university in several water-related engineering and scientific disciplines due in large part to the UWRL. The lab heads and contributes to numerous international projects, particularly in arid Middle Eastern nations.

College of Humanities and Social Sciences 

The College of Humanities and Social Sciences touches nearly every student on campus by teaching required general education classes. The college houses eight departments and more than 30 programs. Departments include English, history, journalism and communication, languages, philosophy and speech communication, military science, political science, sociology, social work and anthropology.

In the Humanities, USU has long history in the study of the American West. The university, through its departments of English and history, respectively, is the host institution for the scholarly journals Western American Literature and the Western Historical Quarterly, the official publications of the Western Literature Association and the Western History Association, respectively.  Additionally, the Department of Journalism and Communication broadcasts weekly the award-winning A-TV News and publishes the student-run Aggie BluePrint magazine.

The Mountain West Center for Regional Studies, a Humanities outreach center at USU, sponsors public events and research focusing on the cultures and history of the Interior West and larger American West. University Special Collections and Archives, located at the Merrill-Cazier Library, has extensive archival holdings documenting the histories of Utah, the Intermountain West, and The Church of Jesus Christ of Latter-day Saints, as well as one of the nation's largest collections pertaining to American folklore, and the lives and works of western authors such as Jack London and poet May Swenson, a Logan native and USU alumna.

The college also houses the USU Museum of Anthropology, currently located in Old Main.

College of Science 
Among the most notable aspects of USU's College of Science includes the rate at which its students are accepted into medical and dental schools. Despite the absence of such professional schools on-site in Logan, students are admitted to medical and dental programs at a rate of nearly 30 percent above the national average each year. This is largely due to the rigorous Prehealth Advising Program and resources like the Cadaver Lab, to which undergraduates have access.

In the past decade, the Physics Department alone has produced a Rhodes Scholar, a Marshall Scholar, a Fulbright Student Scholar, nine Goldwater Scholars, and two Carnegie Professors of the Year.

The College of Science houses the Departments of Biology, Chemistry & Biochemistry, Physics, Computer Science, Mathematics & Statistics, and Geology. The Department of Mathematics & Statistics includes one of only three actuarial science programs in the American West.

Emma Eccles Jones College of Education and Human Services 

USU's Emma Eccles Jones College of Education and Human Services was founded in 1924. With around 5,700 students, the college has been placed in the top 2% of the U.S. News & World Report best graduate schools of education in the U.S. for the past decade. The college ranks 4th nationally in external funding for all colleges of education. The college is accredited by the American Psychological Association.  Faculty are active in many of areas of research, including neuropsychology, child development, health psychology, behavior therapy, and quantitative psychology. The college has a nationally recognized department of Instructional Technology and award-winning faculty in the area of learning sciences. The Department of Special Education and Rehabilitation is ranked in the top 10 nationally according to U.S. News & World Report.

Department of Psychology professor Karl R. White is director of the National Center for Hearing Assessment and Management, which focuses on the early identification and intervention of hearing loss in infants and young children.

USU is the only university in Utah to have a Housing & Financial Counseling program offered through the college's Family, Consumer, and Human Development department. This program offers debt counseling, budget counseling, mortgage default prevention counseling, and reverse mortgage counseling through the USU Family Life Center, which also houses the Marriage & Family Therapy Clinic.

Jon M. Huntsman School of Business 

In 2007, Utah State's College of Business became the Jon M. Huntsman School of Business after a $26 million donation by the philanthropist Jon Huntsman, Sr.

The Huntsman School of Business is the West's oldest continuously operating business college. It offers several graduate and undergraduate degrees in fields including management, accounting, economics, finance, and management information systems (MIS). The bachelor's degree in international business is unique to USU within the state. The prestigious School of Accountancy is distinguished by perennial Top 5 rankings in CPA exam scores by its grad students. In 2014, 75.3% of its students passed the CPA exam placing the program 21 out of 254 institutions in the nation under the "large programs" classification. U.S. News & World Report ranked the Huntsman School 183 nationally for business programs. Its Institute of Management Accountants chapter has received a "Gold Level Award of Excellence" for each of the past 14 years essentially making it the top such institute in the nation. The Huntsman School widely touts its travel programs, including the unique Huntsman Scholar Program, and the impressive transformation it is undergoing as it puts its new resources to use. This effort has included the hiring of high-profile faculty, such as Stephen R. Covey, influential management scholar and author of the wildly popular best-seller The Seven Habits of Highly Effective People. Covey taught classes from 2010 until his death in 2012.

The Huntsman School of Business also houses the Shingo Institute, an outreach program that develops executive education to be licensed and taught to leaders of organizations worldwide. The Shingo Institute also administers the internationally recognized award, the Shingo Prize for Operational Excellence.

In 2011, the Utah Legislature approved funding for a new business building to be located south of the Eccles Business Building. The new building was funded by $36 million in private funds and $14 million in state funds. The  building was completed in 2016 and includes classrooms, faculty offices, a business library, and three new business centers.

S.J. & Jessie E. Quinney College of Natural Resources 

USU has a long and illustrious history in the science and management of forests, rangeland, wildlife, fisheries, and watersheds.  Many graduates of the Quinney College of Natural Resources have gone on to high-level careers in the U.S. Forest Service, National Park Service, and the Bureau of Land Management, and its graduate programs attract high numbers of international students.  The college also operates the Quinney Library, which houses collections relevant to natural resources education, management, and research. The college was formally renamed the S.J. and Jessie E. Quinney College of Natural Resources in 2012 after a $10 million donation was received by the S.J. and Jessie E. Quinney Foundation. The Quinneys were both graduates of USU (then the Agricultural College of Utah), and their foundation has supported the College of Natural Resources for 40 years, contributing more than $40 million in all.

The Quinney College of Natural Resources includes the departments of Watershed Sciences, Environment and Society, and Wildland Resources.

Academics 
As of Fall 2019, there were 27,810 students enrolled of whom 24,669 were undergraduate students and 3,141 were graduate students. 17,279 of these students were enrolled at USU's Logan campus while 10,531 students were enrolled exclusively at regional campuses or in distance education. USU is home to more Carnegie Professors of the Year than any other school in Utah, and boasts nine of the last 15 for the state. The Carnegie is a teaching award, and in fact, USU strongly stresses close undergraduate involvement for even their most prestigious faculty. According to a recent survey, 49.7% of all faculty teach undergraduates, and 63.5% say they've worked with an undergraduate on a research project in the last two years. The university is accredited by the Northwest Commission on Colleges and Universities. USU is also home to a dynamic and successful Honors Program.

Student to Faculty ratio at Utah State University is 21.1 to 1.

Admissions
For the Class of 2022 (enrolling fall 2018), USU received 15,099 applications, accepted 13,446 (89.1%), and enrolled 4,429.  Of the 13% of enrolled first-year students submitting SAT scores, the middle 50% range was 530-650 for critical reading and 520-640 for math; 89% submitted ACT scores, with the middle 50% Composite range equal to 21–28.  Of the 76% of enrolled first-year students who submitted high school class rank, 20.6% were in the top 10% of their high school classes, and 46.6% ranked in the top quarter.  The average high school GPA was 3.56.

Rankings 

According to Business Insider in 2015, USU is the 25th "Most Underrated College" in the United States.

Washington Monthly ranked Utah State 22nd in 2022 among 442 national universities in the U.S. and the 8th public university based on its contribution to the public good, as measured by social mobility, research, and promoting public service.

U.S. News & World Report ranked USU tied for 23rd in "Best Online Bachelor's Programs" in 2020 out of 353 reviewed. Forbes ranked the university No. 155 in Public Colleges, No. 187 in Research Universities, and No. 88 among colleges in the West in 2019. The university also leads the nation in funding for aerospace research and the number of student experiments actually sent out into space. In 2017, Utah State University was ranked No. 1 in the nation by MSN among 1,600 considered schools "based on affordability, flexibility, and other quantitative factors."

Research and environmentalism 

 

Utah State University is classified among "R1: Doctoral Universities – Very high research activity". The National Science Foundation ranked USU 83rd in the nation and second in Utah for research and development expenditures having recorded $304.2 million in 2020. As of 2020, USU received more than $368 million is research support. In addition to its faculty and graduate work, the university strongly emphasizes the importance of undergraduate research. USU's Undergraduate Research program was founded in 1975 making it the second program of its kind in the nation with Massachusetts Institute of Technology founding the first.

Along with the University of Utah, USU is an anchor in the Utah Science Technology and Research (USTAR) program, which is aimed at optimizing the university and region's most marketable strengths with the goal of bolstering Utah's high-tech economy. Seven USTAR teams currently perform research at Utah State. USTAR and USU's Advanced Transportation Institute developed charging technology for electric buses. Now, buses can be powered through wireless induction technology. The bus stops over magnetic pads that will charge the bus while passengers load and unload. A prototype of the technology began service on the University of Utah campus in 2012.

Notable research centers based at USU include the Space Dynamics Laboratory, Energy Dynamics Laboratory, Utah Water Research Laboratory, Center for High Performance Computing, Utah Climate Center, Center for Advanced Nutrition, Center for the School of the Future, National Aquatic Monitoring Center, Intermountain Center for River Rehabilitation and Restoration, Mountain West Center for Regional Studies, and Utah Botanical Center, among others. In 2010, the university received ownership of the more than $30 million Swaner Preserve and EcoCenter outside of Park City. The preserve protects critical wetland and foothill terrain in the heart of one of the state's fastest-growing areas, and the EcoCenter, completed in 2009, is a multi-use facility with space for educational and community activities. The facility is LEED Platinum Certified, the highest standard for design, construction and operation of high-performance green buildings.

Through the Department of Physics (College of Science), Utah State University has placed more student experiments into space than any educational institution in the world. A team of USU and University of Idaho researchers were the first in the world to successfully clone an equine. The baby mule, named Idaho Gem, was born May 4, 2003. USU researchers made headlines in 2011 after breeding transgenic goats. Utah State University professor Randy Lewis' "spider goats", the milk of which contains spider silk, are being studied for uses including human muscle tissue and light-weight bulletproof vests.

Research efforts are underway to produce a cost-competitive bio-diesel from algae. Lance Seefeldt and other professors formed the Biofuels Program at Energy Dynamics Laboratory to develop new and emerging technologies that will produce methane, biodiesel, hydrogen, and alcohols from renewable, carbon-dioxide-neutral energy sources, such as consumer and agricultural waste and sunlight. Dallas Hanks, a doctoral student, has initiated a program at the university called FreeWays to Fuel, which is growing oilseed crops for biodiesel in previously unused municipal land such as highway roadsides. Hanks estimates that in the U.S.,  of such unused land exists—land which generally serves no other purpose and currently costs tax dollars to maintain. Early yields from the crops are promising, and the program has spread to other land-grant universities across the nation. He has a goal to produce  of biofuel in five years.

Utah State University promotes the OpenCourseWare (OCW) Project (open and free university courses) and is developing an open content management system for OCW called eduCommons. This open source content management system is one of the important technology projects in the MIT OpenCourseWare Initiative. eduCommons aids in the creation of OCW sites and has already been adopted by several universities for this purpose.

Athletics 

Utah State University supports organized athletics within the three categories of varsity intercollegiate, club intercollegiate, and intramural. Since its founding in 1888, USU's varsity and club sports and its players have won a combined 16 national championships.

Varsity 
USU's varsity sports teams are known as the Aggies and are a part of the NCAA Division I Mountain West Conference (MWC), which they joined in the summer of 2013. The university's varsity teams have won 37 conference championships including 3 national championships. Golfer Jay Don Blake won the 1980 NCAA Championship and was named NCAA Player of the Year in 1981. Utah State University's 90 All-American athletes have been named All-American 134 times. Utah State Aggies has 14 NCAA Division I teams including:

The men's basketball team plays in the Dee Glen Smith Spectrum, which has been named among the nations "15 Toughest Places To Play In College Basketball." ESPN has also named USU's student section, The HURD, among the smartest in the nation. During the 2008–09 season, USU's ranking in the ESPN/USA Today Coaches' Poll rose as high as #17. USU basketball was 193–13 (.937) at home during the Stew Morrill era, having received 6 NCAA Tournament berths in between 2000 and 2010, and amassed more wins than any team in the nation except Duke, Kansas, and Gonzaga during that time. Utah State captured the Mountain West regular season title in 2018-19 and back-to-back tournament titles during the 2018–19 and 2019–20 seasons. The Aggies have qualified for the NCAA Tournament in each of the last three seasons.

USU's football team is one of 128 schools in the Division I Football Bowl Subdivision (FBS) of the National Collegiate Athletic Association (NCAA) in the United States. After many years of futility in football, USU rose to new heights under head coach Gary Andersen, ending the 2012 regular season with its USU's first-ever 10-win season, its first Western Athletic Conference championship in football, and nationwide Top 25 rankings in all three major polls.

In addition to Andersen's hiring, the football program's renaissance can be attributed in part to a recent emphasis, under Athletics Director Scott Barnes, on recruiting, TV coverage, fundraising, facilities upgrades, and internal reorganization, despite the athletics department's dismal budget in comparison with other state and WAC schools. In recognition of these efforts, USU Athletics was crowned the 2009 National Champion of the Excellence in Management Cup, which seeks to identify the university that wins the most championships with the lowest expenses  Matt Wells was named head coach of USU's football team prior to the 2013–2014 season. In December 2020, Utah State University Vice President and Director of Athletics John Hartwell announced Blake Anderson (American football) as the Aggies' 29th head football coach.

The Aggies were members of the WAC between 2005 and 2012, and the men's teams won several conference championships in that time, including football in 2012, basketball in 2008, 2009, 2010, and 2011, indoor track in 2008, 2010, 2011, outdoor track in 2007, 2009, 2010, and 2011, cross country in 2005, 2006, 2007, 2008, 2009, and 2011. Women's teams also won WAC championships including volleyball in 2012, soccer in 2008, 2010, 2011, and 2012, cross country in 2006 and 2008, outdoor track in 2012 and indoor track in 2012. Utah State has won numerous conference championships in previous conferences. National championships include women's volleyball in 1978 and softball in 1980 and 1981.

As members of the Mountain West Conference, the Aggies have claimed a division title in football and played in the inaugural Mountain West Championship Game in 2013. The men's tennis team won the regular season Mountain West Conference championship in 2016. The men's tennis team won both the Mountain West Conference regular season and tournament championships in 2017. The men's cross country team captured the MW title in 2019 and the volleyball team won the MW regular-season crown in 2021.

Club 
Utah State University's clubs have seen national success having won 15 national titles. USU's baseball club has won 2 national championships, first in 2012 and then again in 2014. The rodeo club has 2 individual national champions in Garrett Thurston and Trevor Merrill. The handball club has claimed 9 national titles among its roster members. And the USU Cycling Club has two individual national championships. An array of club sports exist which students can try out and participate in including:

Intramural 
Intramural sports are offered to students, faculty, and staff.

Media 
Journals published by the university include Utah Science, Western Historical Quarterly, and Western American Literature. The Utah State University Press publishes works in composition studies, folklore, Mormon history, Native American studies, nature and environment, and western history.

The Utah Statesman, or simply The Statesman, is the primary news outlet serving the USU student body. The Statesman is a student-run paper with a faculty adviser. The paper is funded partly by a student fee of $2 per semester and partly by the sale of advertisements. The Statesman is published once a week and distributed free of charge to on-campus locations and off-campus in Downtown Logan. The Statesman won the Society for Professional Journalist's Best Column Writing award in 2002 and Best Non-Daily Student Paper in 2005.

Aggie Radio 92.3 KBLU-LP, an entirely student-run radio station, broadcasts to Cache Valley and online. Aggie Radio is the home of local, alternative and independent music for USU students and the Cache Valley Community. Programming can be found online via RadioFX with many of its podcasts available through major distributors. Aggie Radio is an affiliate for Learfield IMG College and broadcasts all of the Utah State University Football and Women's and Men's Basketball games throughout the season.

Utah Public Radio, based at the university in the MDLS building, is heard on KUSU (91.5 FM) and KUSR (89.5 FM) in Logan, and throughout Utah on a system of 26 translators.  UPR broadcasts "a mix of information, public affairs, and fine arts programming." KUSU is a National Public Radio member station, and an affiliate of Public Radio International.

Aggie Television (ATV) is a cable service lineup of approximately 110 channels offered free of charge to all on-campus residents.  ATV produces Crossroads, a bulletin/announcement channel; and Aggie Advantage, providing local and student video programming.

Notable people 

On June 13, 1899, graduates of the Agricultural College of Utah met to create the Alumni Association. Today, the Alumni Association is located in the historic David B. Haight Alumni Center, which was dedicated July 11, 1991. Alumni chapters exist in Arizona, California, Colorado, Idaho, Nevada, Oregon, Utah, Washington, and Washington, D.C. USU's 149,000 alumni live in all U.S. states and in more than 110 countries.

Particularly notable alumni include Harry Reid, former U.S. Senate Majority Leader; Lars Peter Hansen, one of the three Americans to win the 2013 Nobel Prize in Economic Sciences; May Swenson, poet; Merlin Olsen, pro football hall-of-famer, actor, and TV personality; Ardeshir Zahedi, former Iranian Foreign Minister and Ambassador to the U.S. under the Shah of Iran Mohammad Reza Shah; LaDonna Antoine-Watkins 1996 and 2000 Olympic sprinter; Chris Cooley, pro-football tight-end for the Washington Redskins; Mary L. Cleave, NASA astronaut, Bobby Wagner, a linebacker for the Seattle Seahawks, Lloydene Searle, professional soft ball player and USU Head Softball Coach for 17 years; Julie A. Robinson, Chief Scientist of the International Space Station (ISS) Program at National Aeronautics and Space Administration (NASA) Johnson Space Center; Bibhu Mohapatra, New York-based fashion designer and costume designer; and Ann Overdiek Dalton, co-founder of Perfectly Posh.

Particularly notable faculty include Stephen R. Covey, author of The Seven Habits of Highly Effective People; Michael Ballam, renowned tenor and general director of the Utah Festival Opera; Don L. Lind, NASA Astronaut and member of "The Original 19"; George Dewey Clyde, Governor of Utah; Christopher Cokinos, award-winning poet and nonfiction writer; Hugo de Garis, artificial intelligence researcher; Rainer Maria Latzke, mural and fresco painter, and founder of the Institute of Frescography; David Peak, physicist, Utah Carnegie Professor of the Year, and mentor to 1 Rhodes and 7 Goldwater Scholars; Richard Powers, American novelist and author of The Echo Maker; Joseph Tainter, anthropologist and historian; and Maura Hagan, Professor of Physics and Dean of the College of Science at Utah State University.

Notes

References

Further reading 
 Simmonds, A. J., Pictures Past: A Centennial Celebration of Utah State University (1988), 126 pp
 Parson, Robert, "Encyclopedic History of Utah State University" (2009). Library Faculty & Staff Publications. Paper 121. http://digitalcommons.usu.edu/lib_pubs/121

External links 

 
 Utah State Athletics website

 
1888 establishments in Utah Territory
Educational institutions established in 1888
Land-grant universities and colleges
Buildings and structures in Logan, Utah
Universities and colleges in Cache County, Utah
Public universities and colleges in Utah
Universities and colleges accredited by the Northwest Commission on Colleges and Universities